Animato! was a magazine that was dedicated to animation, generally viewed by animation fans as a successor to Michael Barrier's pioneering Funnyworld and David Mruz's Mindrot/Animania.

History and profile
Animato! was first published in the summer of 1983.The magazine was founded and initially edited by Michael A. Ventrella in Boston in the early 1980s and featured the film Rock & Rule as its first cover. Harry McCracken later become editor and expanded the magazine to full sized with a color cover.

Ventrella later sold the rights to G. Michael Dobbs and Patrick Duquette, who began distributing through newsstands. The magazine was first published under the new ownership in 1992. It ceased publication with issue #40 published in Spring 1999.

External links
 Animato issues at the Internet Archive

See also
 List of film periodicals

References

Animation fandom
1984 establishments in Massachusetts
1999 disestablishments in Massachusetts
Visual arts magazines published in the United States
Film magazines published in the United States
Defunct magazines published in the United States
Magazines established in 1984
Magazines disestablished in 1999
Magazines published in Boston